Sailor Bob was an American children's television program produced by WRVA (then the Richmond, Virginia NBC affiliate) that aired from 1959 through 1969.

Early years 
The program, built around Popeye cartoon segments, was hosted by "Sailor Bob" (Bob Griggs), a former cameraman for WRVA who had studied commercial art at the Richmond Professional Institute. Various puppets designed by Griggs himself, including Gilly Gull, Squeeky Mouse, Captain Paddles, Sparkey and Mr. Bluebird, starred alongside the title sailor. When he was not conversing with these puppets or showing Popeye cartoons, "Sailor Bob" would often draw his own cartoons on camera for the audience. Although the program's broadcast was confined to the central Virginia area, Sailor Bob built a substantial viewership, receiving as many as 8,000 fan letters per month.

In 2011, the show was the subject of a 90-minute documentary film, The Sailor Bob Story. The film debuted at the Byrd Theatre in Richmond on January 11, 2011, and was later broadcast on the local PBS stations WCVE-TV and WHTJ.

Bob Griggs died on February 20, 2019.

References

1959 American television series debuts
1969 American television series endings
1950s American children's television series
1960s American children's television series
Local children's television programming in the United States
American television shows featuring puppetry